IntelliTrack Inc. is an American software company based in Baltimore, Maryland, that specializes in inventory management and asset tracking. It serves the North America, Europe, and Asia-Pacific regions. The company was spun off from PSC Inc. in 2002.

Notable clients include 3M, DHL, Dow, Dupont, ExxonMobil, IBM, and Pepsi, as well as various companies in banking, construction, distribution, government, manufacturing, hospitality, telecommunications, and transportation.

History
IntelliTrack was founded in 1989. The company is owned by Thames Technology Holdings, Inc.

In 2003, IntelliTrack acquired Rio Scan, Inc., a pre-packaged software manufacturer.

In 2016, IntelliTrack released the first cloud-based real-time asset location tracking with motion detection. The real-time locating system (RTLS) with inbuilt temperature and motion detection was launched on October 6, 2016, in Baltimore. 

IntelliTrack’s RTLS application allows for:
Identifying the location and temperature of their assets
Referencing detailed logs of when and who moved their assets
Having full visibility of their asset’s lifecycle
Improving inventory count accuracy

Software
IntelliTrack is a cloud based SaaS tracking solution that includes the following workflows:

IntelliTrack Inventory, which manages inventory locations and quantities. Inventory receipt, movement, and order fulfillment can be tracked in real-time using barcode scanning.
IntelliTrack Assets, which facilitates the tracking of fixed assets like technology and furniture, as well as rotational assets such as tools and off-site equipment. It allows the management and maintenance of critical assets using bar code scanning and RFID for real-time assignees.
IntelliTrack Mailroom, facilitates the tracking of inbound mail and packages from receipt from the carrier to delivery to a mail stop or individual. Mailroom also provides signature capture for proof of delivery. It supports data capture via bar code scanning and captures photos of items as well.
IntelliTrack Equipment, is designed to manage the check in and check out of equipment. Whether you manage a tool room or loaning IT assets, IntelliTrack Equipment allows you to loan employees equipment via a simple check in/out process. IntelliTract also provides the ability to reserve equipment for a future date.
It can be integrated with Quickbooks and Sage 50, as well as Shopify and Magento.

See also
PSC Inc.
Real-time locating system

References

Software companies of the United States
Radio-frequency identification